Scott Christian College, Nagercoil alumni are often referred to as Scotians, a name derived from its Scottish founder's initial Old English name. The list of Scott Christian College pupils, featuring members of the University of Cambridge, are segregated in accordance with their fields of achievement. This list includes individuals who have either studied at the university or worked at the university in an academic capacity.

The list has been divided into categories indicating the field of activity in which people have become well known. Many of the university’s alumni have attained a level of distinction in more than one field. These individuals may appear under two categories. In general, however, an attempt has been made to put individuals in the category with which they are most often associated.

Scientists
Dr. D.J. Bagyaraj - senior scientist, Indian Institute of Science, Bangalore
Dr. Gunamudian David Boaz - first Indian psychologist
Dr. J Daniel Chellappa - nuclear scientist; Deputy Director of Department of Atomic Energy
Dr. Raja Chelliah - economist; former advisor to World Bank
Dr. Selvin Christopher - director of Centre for Airborne Systems, Defence Research and Development Organisation; recipient of Padma Shri
Dr. Ranjan Roy Daniel - former director of Tata Institute of Fundamental Research; recipient of Padma Bhushan
Dr. C. Livingstone - biological scientist; former Chancellor of Madras Christian College
Dr. A.E. Muthunayagam - former director of Indian Space Research Organisation and Indian Institute of Technology Madras; recipient of Padma Bhushan
Dr. M.S.S. Pandian - veteran Indian historian and social scientist
Dr. Samuel Paul - founder and former director of Indian Institute of Management Ahmedabad
Dr. M. J. Xavier - founder and director of Indian Institute of Management Ranchi

Mathematicians
Dr. Subbayya Sivasankaranarayana Pillai - mathematician; recipient of Padma Bhushan

Indian police service
Dr. F. V. Arul (IPS) - former Director of Central Bureau of Investigation; Commissioner of Police (Greater Chennai); first Indian Vice-President of Interpol
Dr.C. Sylendra Babu - present Director-General of Police , Tamil Nadu 
Dr. Walter Devaram - former Inspector-General of Police; Indian Super Cop and Padma Shri awardee
G. Nanchil Kumaran - former Inspector-General of Police and Police Commissioner, Chennai
Christopher Nelson - former Inspector-General of Police; lifetime member of Planning Commission

Indian administrative service
Thiru Anand T - Project Officer DRDA, Tamil Nadu Government
Thiru P. Ekambaram - Managing Director of Tamil Nadu Water Board
Thiru V.M. Xavier Chrisso Nayagam - Director of Social Welfare to Government of Tamil Nadu
Thiru S. Thangaswami - Commissioner, Minorities Welfare to Government of India
Dr. R. Vijaykumar - Additional Chief Secretary to Government of India

Chief of Naval Staff
Admiral Oscar Stanley Dawson - 12th Chief of Naval Staff
Admiral Sushil Kumar - 18th Chief of Naval Staff

Cinema
J. C. Daniel - "father of the Malayalam film industry"
Ganesh Janardhanan (VTV Ganesh) - Tamil comedian and actor
Rani Jeyraj - Miss India, 1996
R. Muttusamy - "the father of the Sri Lankan film industry"
Sathyaneshan Nadar - Malayalam actor
Jagathy N. K. Achary - Malayalam Script Writer
Sukumaran - Malayalam actor

Educationalists
 Dr. H. S. S. Lawrence - former Director of Education, India; UNESCO Adviser

Businessmen

Politicians
A.V. Bellarmin - former Lok Sabha member
J. Helen Davidson - current Lok Sabha member
Dr. N. Dennis, former and seven-time Lok Sabha member
Nanjil K. Manoharan - co-founder of Dravida Munnetra Kazhagam (DMK)
Kunjan Nadar - former Lok Sabha member
Dr. Marshal Nesamony, former Lok Sabha member

Authors and poets
Dr. David Davidar - former CEO of Penguin Group; Harvard University faculty
Dr. M. J. Rabi Singh - linguistic scholar

Environmentalists
Dr. J. C. Daniel - ornithologist and naturalist
S. S. Davidson - environmentalist
Dr. A.J.T. Johnsingh - scientist, former director of the Wildlife Institute of India

Theology
Gnanasigamony Devakadasham - Bishop of the largest Indian church, Church of South India
John Gladstone - former Bishop of Church of South India

Sports
W. Antony Dhas - cricketer
Thalaivan Sargunam - cricketer and Sunrisers Hyderabad batsman

References

Scott Christian College